Gara River, a perennial river that is a tributary of the Macleay River, is located in the Northern Tablelands region of New South Wales, Australia.

Course and features
The river rises at the junction of the southern slopes of the Great Dividing Range and the Ben Lomond Range, near Llangothlin, and flows generally south and southeast, joined by four minor tributaries, until the river reaches a junction with Salisbury Waters within Oxley Wild Rivers National Park and descends to its confluence with the Macleay River, below Blue Nobby Mountain, south east of Armidale. The river descends  over its  course and is impounded by Guyra Dam and Malpas Reservoir.

In its lower reaches, the Gara River is transversed by the Waterfall Way.

See also

 Rivers of New South Wales
 List of rivers of New South Wales (A–K)
 List of rivers of Australia

References

External links
 
 Northern Rivers Geology Blog – Macleay River

 

Rivers of New South Wales
Northern Tablelands